This is a list of the 21 members of the European Parliament for Hungary elected at the 2019 European Parliament election. They serve in the 2019 to 2024 session.

Elected MEPs 

 Andrea Bocskor – Fidesz
 Andor Deli – Fidesz
 Attila Ara-Kovács – Democratic Coalition (DK)
 Katalin Cseh – Momentum Movement
 Anna Júlia Donáth – Momentum Movement
 Klára Dobrev – Democratic Coalition (DK)
 Tamás Deutsch – Fidesz
 Csaba Molnár – Democratic Coalition (DK)
 Ádám Kósa – Fidesz
 András Gyürk – Fidesz
 Márton Gyöngyösi – Jobbik
 Enikő Győri – Fidesz
 Kinga Gál – Fidesz
 Lívia Járóka – Fidesz
 Edina Tóth – Fidesz
 László Trócsányi – Fidesz
 Balázs Hidvéghi – Fidesz
 József Szájer – Fidesz (retired effective 31 December 2020)
 István Ujhelyi – Hungarian Socialist Party (MSZP)
 Sándor Rónai – Democratic Coalition (DK)
 György Hölvényi – Christian Democratic People's Party (KDNP)

References 

2019 in Hungary
MEPs for Hungary 2019–2024
Lists of Members of the European Parliament 2019–2024